Sarah-Sofie Boussnina (born 28 December 1990) is a Danish actress, best known to international audiences for the TV series The Bridge and 1864 (2014).

Career
In 2018, Boussnina appeared as Martha in Helen Edmundson's film Mary Magdalene.

Personal life
Sarah-Sofie Boussnina was born in Svendborg, Denmark, where she attended Svendborg Gymnasium. She is of Danish & Tunisian ancestry. In May 2016, she married pop singer Louis Samson Myhre, the lead vocalist of Julias Moon.

Selected filmography
Bora Bora (2011)
The Absent One (2014)
Mary Magdalene (2018)
The Birdcatcher (2019)
Tides (The Colony) (2021)

Selected television
Park Road (2009–2010)
Tvillingerne & Julemanden (2013– )
1864 (2014)
The Bridge (2015)
Black Lake (2016)
Knightfall (2017)
Dune: The Sisterhood (TBA)

External links

References

1990 births
Danish actresses
Danish people of Italian descent
Danish people of Tunisian descent
Living people
People from Svendborg
21st-century Danish actresses